Walter Bell Denny is an American art historian and educator. A scholar of Islamic art, Denny is a University Distinguished Professor of Art History at the University of Massachusetts Amherst.

Career
Denny graduated cum laude from Oberlin College with a Bachelor of Arts in 1964. He then earned a Master of Arts and Doctor of Philosophy in Art History from Harvard University in 1965 and 1971, respectively. Denny wrote a doctoral dissertation on ceramics from the Rüstem Pasha Mosque.

Denny has taught exclusively at the University of Massachusetts Amherst since 1970. He was elevated to the rank of University Distinguished Professor of Art History there. Throughout his career, Denny has been a scholar of Islamic art, studying such subjects as the Rüstem Pasha Mosque and the Saz style.

See also
List of Harvard University people
List of Oberlin College alumni
List of University of Massachusetts Amherst faculty

References

External links
Official website
University of Massachusetts Amherst profile

Living people
Year of birth missing (living people)
American art historians
Historians of Islamic art
Oberlin College alumni
Harvard University alumni
University of Massachusetts Amherst faculty